Vandeleuria is a small genus of rodent from Asia with only three species. It is the only member of the tribe Vandeleurini. Species in this genus are known as the long-tailed climbing mice.

Species 

Nilgiri long-tailed tree mouse, Vandeleuria nilagirica Jerdon, 1867
Nolthenius's long-tailed climbing mouse, Vandeleuria nolthenii Phillips, 1929
Asiatic long-tailed climbing mouse, Vandeleuria oleracea Bennett, 1832

References

 
Rodent genera
Taxa named by John Edward Gray